This is a list of Algerian cities and towns with more than 100,000 inhabitants, and towns and villages with more than 20,000 inhabitants. For a list of all the 1,541 municipalities (baladiyahs) of Algeria, see List of municipalities of Algeria, and for the postal code of an Algerian city, see list of postal codes of Algerian cities.

List of Algerian cities and towns with more than 100,000 inhabitants

List of Algerian cities and towns with 50,000-99,999 inhabitants

A 

Adrar (68 276)
Aïn Defla (65 453)
Aïn Fakroun (55 282)
Aïn Oulmene (73 831)
Aïn M'lila (88 441)
Aïn Sefra (52 320)
Aïn Témouchent (75 558)
Aïn Touta (59 904)
Akbou (53 282)
Azzaba (56 922)

B 

Berrouaghia (60 152)
Bir el-Ater (77 727)
Boufarik (71 446)
Bouira (88 801)

C 

Chelghoum Laid (82 560)
Cheria (75 344)
Chettia (71 490)

E 

El Bayadh (91 632)
El Guerrara (59 514)
El-Khroub (65 344)

F 

Frenda (54 162)
Ferdjioua (61 894)

G 

Ghardaïa (93 423)

H 

Hassi Bahbah (86 421)

K 
Khemis Miliana (84 574)
Ksar Chellala (52 753)
Ksar Boukhari (67 813)

L 

Lakhdaria (59 746)
Larbaâ (83 819)

M 

Mecheria (66 465)
Mila (69 052)
Mohammadia (84 700)

O 

Oued Rhiou (64 685)
Ouenza (52 737)
Ouled Djellal (63 237)
Ouled Yaïch (87 131)
Oum El Bouaghi (80 359)

R 

Ras El Oued (51 482)
Rouissat (58 112)

S 

Sédrata (53 218)
Sidi Aïssa (72 062)
Sig (70 499)
Sougueur (78 956)
Sour El-Ghozlane (50 120)

T 

Taher (77 367)
Tamanrasset (54 469)
Tissemsilt (75 197)
Tolga (55 809)

See also 
 Provinces of Algeria
 List of municipalities of Algeria
 List of metropolitan areas in Africa
 List of largest cities in the Arab world

References

External links 

National Office of Statistics (NOS), official website (English)
Mongabay - City population estimates
City Population - Older censuses

 
Cities
Algeria
Algeria, List of cities in
Algeria